Detonula is a genus of diatoms belonging to the family Thalassiosiraceae.

The genus name of Detonula is in honour of Giovanni Battista de Toni (1864–1924), who was an Italian botanist, mycologist and phycologist.

The genus was circumscribed by Franz Schütt ex Giovanni Battista De Toni in Syll. Algarum Vol.2 on page 1425 in 1894.

Species
As of 2021;:
Detonula confervacea 
Detonula cystifera 
Detonula delicatula 
Detonula moseleyana 
Detonula pumila 
Detonula schroederi 
Detonula subtilissima

References

Thalassiosirales
Diatom genera